Egyptian National Railways (ENR) is the national railway of Egypt and managed by the parastatal Egyptian Railway Authority (ERA).

History

1833–1877

In 1833, Muhammad Ali Pasha considered building a railway between Suez and Cairo to improve transit between Europe and India. Muhammad Ali had proceeded to buy the rail when the project was abandoned due to pressure by the French who had an interest in building a canal instead.

Muhammad Ali died in 1848, and in 1851 his successor Abbas I contracted Robert Stephenson to build Egypt's first standard gauge railway. The first section, between Alexandria on the Mediterranean coast and Kafr el-Zayyat on the Rosetta branch of the Nile was opened in 1854. This was the first railway in the Ottoman Empire as well as Africa and the Middle East. In the same year Abbas died and was succeeded by Sa'id Pasha, in whose reign the section between Kafr el-Zayyat and Cairo was completed in 1856 followed by an extension from Cairo to Suez in 1858. This completed the first modern transport link between the Mediterranean and the Indian Ocean, as Ferdinand de Lesseps did not complete the Suez Canal until 1869.

At Kafr el-Zayyat the line between Cairo and Alexandria originally crossed the Nile with an  car float. However, on 15 May 1858 a special train conveying Sa'id's heir presumptive Ahmad Rifaat Pasha fell off the float into the river and the prince was drowned. By the end of Sa'id's reign branches had been completed from Banha to Zagazig on the Damietta branch of the Nile in 1860, to Mit Bera in 1861 and from Tanta to Talkha further down the Damietta Nile in 1863.

Sa'id's successor Isma'il Pasha strove to modernise Egypt and added momentum to railway development. In 1865 a new branch reached Desouk on the Rosetta Nile and a second route between Cairo and Talkha was opened, giving a more direct link between Cairo and Zagazig. The following year a branch southwards from Tanta reached Shibin El Kom. The network started to push southwards along the west side of the Nile with the opening of the line between Imbaba near Cairo and Minya in 1867. A short branch to Faiyum was added in 1868. A line between Zagazig and Suez via Nifisha was completed in the same year. The following year the line to Talkha was extended to Damietta on the Mediterranean coast and a branch opened to Salhiya and Sama'ana.

Imbaba had no rail bridge across the Nile to Cairo until 1891. However, a long line between there and a junction west of Kafr el-Zayyat opened in 1872, linking Imbaba with the national network. From Minya the line southwards made slower progress, reaching Mallawi in 1870 and Assiut in 1874. On the west bank till Najee Hammady from which goes on east bank of the Nile till Aswan. A shorter line southwards linked Cairo with Tura in 1872 and was extended to Helwan in 1875. In the Nile Delta the same year a short branch reached Kafr el-Sheikh and in 1876 a line along the Mediterranean coast linking the termini at Alexandra and Rosetta was completed.

1877–1888
By 1877, Egypt had a network of key main lines and the Nile Delta had quite a network, but with this and other development investments, Isma'il had gotten the country deeply into debt. For its first 25 years of operation Egypt's national railway had never even produced an annual report. A Council of Administration with Egyptian, British and French members was appointed in 1877 to put the railway's affairs in order. They published its first annual report in 1879, and in the same year, the British Government had Isma'il Pasha deposed, exiled and replaced with his son Tewfik Pasha.  In 1882, the British essentially invaded and occupied Egypt.

With these developments, the Egyptian Railway Administration's rail network stagnated until 1888, but it also put its management in much better order. In 1883 the ERA appointed Frederick Harvey Trevithick, nephew of Francis Trevithick, as Chief Mechanical Engineer. Trevithick found a heterogeneous fleet of up to 246 steam locomotives of many different designs from very different builders in England, Scotland, France and the USA. This lack of standardisation of locomotives or components complicated both locomotive maintenance and general railway operation.

From 1877 to 1888, the ERA struggled to keep up with even basic maintenance but by 1887 Trevithick managed to start a programme to renew 85 of the very mixed fleet of locomotives with new boilers, cylinders and motion. He started to replace the others with four standard locomotive types introduced from 1889 onwards: one class of 0-6-0 for freight, one class of 2-4-0 for mixed traffic, one 0-6-0T tank locomotive for shunting and one class of only ten 2-2-2 locomotives for express passenger trains. Trevithick ensured that these four classes shared as many common components as possible, which simplified maintenance and reduced costs still further.

1888–1914

By 1888, the ERA was in better order and could resume expanding its network. In 1890 a second line between Cairo and Tura opened. On 15 May 1892 the Imbaba Bridge was built across the Nile, linking Cairo with the line south following the west bank of the river. The civil engineer for the bridge was Gustave Eiffel. (It was reformed and renewed in 1924 which is still the only railway bridge across the Nile in Cairo.) Cairo's main Misr Station was rebuilt in 1892. The line south was extended further upriver from Assiut reaching Girga in 1892, Nag Hammadi in 1896, Qena in 1897 and Luxor and Aswan in 1898.  With the railroad's completion, construction began the same year on the first Aswan Dam and the Assiut Barrage, main elements of a plan initiated in 1890 by the government to modernize and more fully develop Egypt's existing irrigated agriculture, export potential, and ability to repay debts to European creditors.

In the north in 1891, a link line was opened between Damanhur and Desouk. The line to Shibin El Kom was extended south to Minuf in the same year and reached Ashum in 1896. By then a line across the Nile Delta from a junction north of Talkha on the line to Damietta had reached Biyala. By 1898 this reached Kafr el-Sheikh, completing a more direct route between Damietta and Alexandria. An important extension along the west bank of the Suez Canal linking Nifisha with Ismaïlia, Al Qantarah West and Port Said was completed in 1904. Thereafter network expansion was slower but two short link lines north of Cairo were completed in 1911 followed by a link between Zagazig and Zifta in 1914.

Sinai
The first El Ferdan Railway Bridge over the Suez Canal was completed in April 1918 for the Palestine Military Railway. It was considered a hindrance to shipping so after the First World War it was removed. During the Second World War a steel swing bridge was built in 1942 but this was damaged by a steamship and removed in 1947. A double swing bridge was completed in 1954 but the 1956 Israeli invasion of Sinai severed rail traffic across the canal for a third time. A replacement bridge was completed in 1963 but destroyed in the Six-Day War in 1967. A new double swing bridge was completed in 2001 and is the largest swing bridge in the world. However, the construction of the New Suez Canal has since disconnected the Sinai from the rest of Egypt’s rail network again. Instead of the bridge, two rail tunnels are planned under the canal, one near Ismailia and one in Port Said.

Historically, the Palestine Railways main line linked Al Qantarah East with Palestine and Lebanon. It was built in three phases during the First and Second World Wars. Commenced in 1916, it was extended to Rafah on the border with Palestine as part of the Egyptian Expeditionary Force's Sinai and Palestine Campaign against the Ottoman Empire. The route was extended through to Haifa in Mandate Palestine after World War I, to Tripoli, Lebanon in 1942 and became a vital part of the wartime supply route for Egypt.

As a result of the 1947–1949 Palestine war, the Palestine Railways main line was severed at the 1949 Armistice Line. The 1956 Israeli invasion severed Sinai's rail link with the rest of Egypt was reconnected its rail link with Israel. Israel captured a 4211 class 0-6-0 diesel shunting locomotive and five 545 class 2-6-0 steam locomotives. Israel also captured rolling stock including a six-wheel coach dating from 1893 and a 30-ton steam crane built in 1950, both of which Israel Railways then appropriated into its breakdown fleet. Before being forced to withdraw from Sinai in March 1957, Israel systematically destroyed infrastructure including the railway. By 1963 the railway in Sinai was reconnected to the rest of Egypt but remained disconnected from Israel.

In the 1967 Six-Day War, Israel captured more Egyptian railway equipment including one EMD G8, four EMD G12 and three EMD G16 diesel locomotives all of which were appropriated into Israel Railways stock. After 1967 Israel again destroyed the railway across occupied Sinai and this time used the materials in the construction of the Bar Lev Line of fortifications along the Suez Canal.

After long service on Israel Railways, the 30-ton crane, 1893 Belgian 6-wheel coach and one of the EMD G16 diesels are all preserved in the Israel Railway Museum in Haifa.

Museum
Egypt's railway museum was built in 1932 next to Misr Station (now Ramses Station) in Cairo. The museum opened in January 1933 to mark the city's hosting of the International Railway Congress. Its stock of over 700 items includes models, historic drawings and photographs. Among its most prominent exhibits are three preserved steam locomotives:
2-2-4 no. 30, built by Robert Stephenson and Company in 1862
0-6-0 no. 986 (originally 189, then 142), built by Robert Stephenson and Company in 1861
4-4-2 no. 194 (originally 678) built by the North British Locomotive Company in 1905

Operations
In 2005 ENR operated  of standard gauge  track. Most of the rail system is focused on the Nile delta with lines essentially fanning out from Cairo. In addition, there is a line to the west along the coast that eventually could link to Libya as it did during World War II. From Cairo goes a major line south along the east bank of the Nile to Aswan (Sellel) in Upper Egypt. Neighboring Israel uses the same standard gauge but has been disconnected since 1948. In the South the railway system of Sudan operates on a narrow gauge and is reached after using the ferry past the Aswan dam. Rail service is a critical part of the transportation infrastructure of Egypt but of limited service for transit.  of the network is electrified, namely commuter lines between Cairo-Helwan and Cairo-Heliopolis.

ENR buys locomotives and rail abroad but passenger coaches are built and refurbished in Egypt by the Société Générale Egyptienne de Matériel de Chemins de Fer (SEMAF).

Cargo volume transported by ENR is about 12 million tonnes annually.

Services were severely disrupted during the political protests in early 2011; operating hours of the Cairo Metro were shortened to comply with the curfew.

On 16 January 2015, Egyptian National Railways signed a €100 million contract with Alstom to supply signalling equipment for the 240 km Beni Suef-Asyut line and maintain services for five years. Also, Alstom will provide smartlock electronic interlocking system to replace the existing electromechanical system, which in turn will increase the number of trains that operate on the route by more than 80%.

High-speed rail project 

The line has been dubbed "Green Line" or "Suez Canal on rails", and is to be used by both freight and passenger trains. In addition to carrying out electrification and installation of ETCS Level 2, Siemens will supply Velaro high-speed trains, Desiro regional sets, and Vectron freight locomotives. Two further lines, one connecting the Greater Cairo region to Aswan, and Luxor via Hurghada to Safaga, were included in May 2022.

Passenger trains

ER is the backbone of passenger transportation in Egypt with 800 million passenger miles annually. Air-conditioned passenger trains usually have 1st and 2nd class service, while non-airconditioned trains have 2nd and 3rd class. Most of the network connects the densely populated area of the Nile delta with Cairo and Alexandria as hubs. Train fares in commuter trains and 3rd class passenger trains are kept low as a social service.

There are large volumes of tourist traffic during Eid; this causes problems due to a shortage of rolling stock.

Sleeper trains
The Alexandria–Cairo–Luxor–Aswan route is served daily in both directions by air-conditioned sleeper trains of Abela Egypt. This service is especially attractive to tourists who can spend the night on the train as it covers the stretch between Cairo and Luxor. A luxury express train also links Cairo with Marsa Matruh towards the Libyan border.

Locomotives

Current
The vast majority of ENR locomotives are diesel. These include:

In 2009 ENR began taking delivery of 40 Electro-Motive Diesel JT42CWRM (Series 66) locomotives for passenger services. In 2009, ENR received 80 dual cab ES40ACi locomotives in two versions (painted blue for passenger trains and red/black for freight trains).

In 2017, Egyptian National Railways placed an order for 100 ES30ACi Light Evolution Series Locomotives valued at worth $575 million that can be used for both passengers or freight rail. The first 10 units were delivered in November 2019.

Retired

Bus and ferry services
ENR serves a number of places by bus services including Abu Simbel (bus/ferry), Sharm el Sheik, Siwa Oasis, and Hurghada. In 1936, the company owned 64 buses, 6 steamships, 12 barges, 18 pontoon boats.

Accidents

 April 18, 2021 2021 Toukh train accident : At least 32 people are killed and 109 injured after a train derails in Toukh.
 March 26, 2021 Sohag train collision: Two trains collide in the Tahta district of the Upper Egypt governorate of Sohag, resulting in 18 deaths and 200 injuries. 
February 27, 2019 Ramses Station train collision
 August 11, 2017 Alexandria train collision
 January 14, 2013 Badrashin train accident
 November 17, 2012 Manfalut train accident: Train crashes into a bus carrying school children at a level crossing near Manfalut, killing 51 and injuring 17.
According to a security official an initial report stated that 30 people were suspected killed and 50 injured.
 September 4, 2006: A passenger train collides with a freight train north of Cairo, killing five and injuring 30.
 February 20, 2002 Al Ayatt train disaster: A train packed to double capacity catches fire, 373 are killed.
 2000: A train crashed into a minibus at an intersection south of Cairo, with 9 killed and two wounded.
 November 1999: 10 killed between Cairo and Alexandria
 April 1999: 10 killed in Northern Egypt head-on collision between two trains
 1998 Kafr Al-Dawar accident: "about 50" killed
 1997 2 major accidents: one with 14 killed, the other with 7 killed
 1995: Derailment just north of Cairo: 9 killed; Quesna accident (collision with bus): 49 killed; Beni Sweif accident: 75 killed
 1994 collision: more than 40 killed
 1993 collision: 40 killed
 1992 head-on collision at Badrashin: 43 killed

Problems 
The debacle of the 2002 Al Ayyat railway accident showed significant deficiencies in the status and maintenance of the equipment. In the aftermath, the ERA initiated a program to update equipment and improve safety. While some services have been privatized (i.e. food service, sleeper trains), ENR is considering further steps in privatization to increase efficiency and improve service. In addition, ENR has dormant real estate holding that it plans to utilize in a more profitable way.

The 2006 Qalyoub train collision led to further criticism of the management of the ENR raising issues of underfunding and corruption. The head of the ERA, Hanafy Abdel-Qawi, was dismissed one day after the accident. In response to the accidents an investment programme was launched in 2007 with the aim of modernising the rail network and improving safety standards.

Poor maintenance, lack of investment and negligent railway employees have led to frequent crashes on Egypt’s railway system. The 2002 Al Ayyat railway accident was the deadliest train disaster that killed over 373 people.

Major stations 

Most major lines originate from Ramses Station, Cairo or Misr Station, Alexandria: 
 Marsa Matruh
 Suez
Ismailia
 Port Said
Mansoura
 Damietta
 Giza
 Minya
 Luxor
 Aswan

Railway links to adjacent countries 
 Libya – under construction (same gauge – ) (suspended)
 Sudan – none (break-of-gauge /) (proposed)
 Gaza Strip – defunct since 1948
 Israel – defunct since 1948

Narrow gauge 

There is a modest network of narrow gauge railways at Kurna, on the west Nile bank opposite Luxor. A smaller network of the same gauge and for the same purpose exists on the east bank, around the southern outskirts of Luxor.

Haulage is by diesel locomotive. Rolling stock includes rakes of bogie bolster wagons, typically seen loaded high with sugar cane.

See also 
 Transport in Egypt
 Arab Mashreq International Railway

References

Bibliography

External links 

 Official website of the Egyptian National Railways
 Map of System (Lower Egypt)
 Unofficial website with galleries
 Mike’s Railway History: Egypt 1935
 Proposals
 More pictures of the narrow gauge lines
 Unofficial website with trains schedule

Railway companies of Egypt
Government-owned companies of Egypt
History museums in Egypt
Egyptian brands
Ottoman railways